Bakal is a village in Barishal District in the Barishal Division of southern-central Bangladesh.

References

Populated places in Barisal District